Carlos Gagini (1865–1925) was a Costa Rican intellectual, philologist writer, esperantist and linguist.

He was born in Costa Rica, in a family of Swiss descent. He was a significant figure in linguistics and literature in Costa Rica. His work in language studies formed the basis for a large part of Costa Rican academic exploration during the twentieth century.

Life and career
He published many works about education, grammar, and anthropology.

In literature, he supported the national character of Costa Rican writing, in contrast to other authors who looked to European models for inspiration. As a strong defender of national identity and independence, he wrote a novel which criticized imperialism.

In 2001, on the 75th anniversary of his death, in the faculty of Arts and Letters of the University of Costa Rica, an esperanto memorial was inaugurated in his memory.

Works by Gagini
 Diccionario de Barbarimos y Provincialismos de Costa Rica (1892)
 Ensayo Lexicográfico sobre la Lengua Térraba (1892)
 Chamarasca (1898)
 Diccionario de Costarriqueñismos (1919)
 La Caida del Aguila (1920)
 Erizo: novela histórica
 El árbol enfermo
 Redemptions: a Costa Rican novel translated by E. Bradford Burns (1985)

Biography
 Carlos Gagini. Presentado por Lilia Ramos y Mariana de Silva (1972)
 Al través de mi vida (1961)

References

External links
 Carlos Gagini 
 

Costa Rican male short story writers
Costa Rican short story writers
Costa Rican male writers
Writers of Esperanto literature
Linguists
1865 births
1925 deaths
Costa Rican people of Swiss descent
Costa Rican Esperantists